Risky Business is a lost 1920 Universal silent drama film directed by Harry B. Harris and Rollin S. Sturgeon. It stars Gladys Walton.

Cast
Gladys Walton as Phillipa
Lillian Lawrence as Mrs. Fanshaw Renwick
Maude Wayne as Errica
Nanine Wright as Grandma
Grant McKay as Roger
Fred Malatesta as Ralli
John Gough as Valet
Louis Willoughby as Captain Chantry
Fred Andrews as Dr. Houghton

References

External links

 

1920 films
American silent feature films
Universal Pictures films
Films based on short fiction
Lost American films
1920 drama films
American black-and-white films
Silent American drama films
Films directed by Rollin S. Sturgeon
1920 lost films
Lost drama films
1920s American films